Suwa or SUWA may refer to:

Places 
 Suwa Province, an old Japanese province located in Tōsandō for a brief period of time, which today composes the southern part of Nagano Prefecture
 Suwa, Nagano, a city in Nagano Prefecture, Japan
 Suwa Shrine (disambiguation), the name of several Shinto shrines in Japan
 Lake Suwa, a lake in the Kiso Mountains, in the central region of Nagano Prefecture, Japan
 Suwa, a small ancient Egyptian site about 10 km south-east of Zagazig in the Nile Delta
 Suwa, Diz, a historical Assyrian hamlet in Hakkari, Turkey

Organizations 
 Southern Utah Wilderness Alliance, a wilderness preservation organization in the United States based in Salt Lake City, Utah

People 
 Michiko Suwa (1935-2015), the maiden name of Japanese-American marathoner Miki Gorman
 Nanaka Suwa (born 1994), Japanese voice actress
 Nejiko Suwa (1920–2012), Japanese violinist
 Nobuhiro Suwa (born 1960), Japanese film director
, Japanese daimyō
 Takahiro Suwa (born 1975), Japanese wrestler better known by his ring name "SUWA"
 Tetsushi Suwa (born 1969), Japanese writer 
 Toshinari Suwa (born 1977), Japanese marathon runner
 Suwa Kanenori (1897–1932), Japanese woodblock print artist
 Suwa Yorimitsu (1480–1540), Japanese warlord of the Shinano Province
 Suwa Yorishige (1516–1542), Japanese lord of Kuwabara castle

Fictional characters 
 Amaki Suwa, Goshiki Suwa, and Masuzu Suwa, fictional characters from the Strike Witches franchise

Other 
 Suwa', an idol mentioned in the Qur'an
 Suwa, the traditional beer of the Tigray Region in Ethiopia.

See also

Suva (disambiguation)

Japanese-language surnames